Lala Yusifova (born 16 October 1996) is a retired Azerbaijani rhythmic gymnast.

Career 
Yusifova began competing in junior internationals in 2009. She won the silver medal in ball at the 2010 European Junior Championships and briefly competed as a member of the Azerbaijani Group gymnasts who won the bronze medal 2011 European Junior Championships in Minsk.

Yusifova debuted as a full senior in 2012. In the absence of most veteran rhythmic gymnasts competing in Grand Prix after the 2012 Summer Olympics she was able to compete at the 2012 Grand Prix Final in Brno where she won silver medals in ribbon and clubs behind the reigning Olympic silver medalist Daria Dmitrieva. In 2013, at the 2013 Miss Valentine Cup in Tartu, Estonia, Yusifova won the bronze medal in hoop and at the 2013 Irina Deleanu Cup she won another bronze medal in hoop. She competed at the 2013 European Championships in Vienna, Austria where she and teammate Marina Durunda represented Azerbaijan, finishing fourth in the Team event. She qualified to the clubs final and finished 7th at the final. She won the silver medal at the 2013 Azerbaijan National Championships behind champion Marina Durunda. At the 2013 World Cup Final in Saint Petersburg, Russia, she finished 8th in all-around and qualified for the ball final where she finished 8th.

Yusifova tied for 13th place with Jana Berezko-Marggrander in the All-around at the 2013 World Championships. She competed at the 2013 Grand Prix Brno and finished 9th in the all-around. She competed at the 2013 Grand Prix Final in Berlin and finished 6th in all-around. She qualified to four event finals and won bronze in clubs. At the 2013 Aeon Cup in Tokyo, Japan, Yusifova finished 5th in Team event and 6th in the All-around finals.

In 2014, Yusifova missed competing in the early season due to shoulder injury. In April, Yusifova returned to competition at the 2014 Azerbaijan National Championships where she won the all-around silver medal behind reigning national champion Marina Durunda. Yusifova competed in her first event internationally at the 2014 Corbeil-Essonnes World Cup and finished 16th in all-around. She qualified to 1 event final and finished 6th in ball. Shortly after her brief return, Yusifova announced her retirement on September 3.

Routine music information

References

External links
 

1996 births
Living people
Azerbaijani rhythmic gymnasts
Sportspeople from Baku